Varqeh Rural District is in the Central District of Charuymaq County, East Azerbaijan province, Iran. At the National Census of 2006, its population was 3,546 in 689 households. There were 2,922 inhabitants in 807 households at the following census of 2011. At the most recent census of 2016, the population of the rural district was 2,736 in 827 households. The largest of its 32 villages was Imeshjeh, with 331 people.

References 

Charuymaq County

Rural Districts of East Azerbaijan Province

Populated places in East Azerbaijan Province

Populated places in Charuymaq County